Shift was a Canadian magazine, devoted to technology and culture. It has now ceased publication as a print magazine. Its website continued to publish new content for at least a year after the print title was discontinued, but is no longer in operation. The magazine was based in Toronto, Ontario.

History and profile
Shift was founded as a quarterly publication in 1992 by Evan Solomon and Andrew Heintzman. The first issue was published in July 1992. It was originally an arts and literary journal, but evolved into a technology magazine with a special focus on Internet culture in 1994. Articles by regular writer Clive Thompson focused on the culture and theory behind new media. In 1997 the magazine was acquired by Montreal-based company BHVR. Solomon left the magazine in 1999 to devote more time to his writing and broadcasting career.

In the late 1990s and the early 2000s, the magazine attempted to expand its American presence in order to compete with similar magazines such as Wired. In 2000 the magazine was sold to its staff and the founder Andrew Heintzman again became the president of Shift Multimedia. Although magazine started its edition in the USA, it eventually ceased publishing. A short-lived television show inspired by the magazine was also unsuccessful.

References

1992 establishments in Ontario
2003 disestablishments in Ontario
Bi-monthly magazines published in Canada
Cultural magazines published in Canada
Monthly magazines published in Canada
Quarterly magazines published in Canada
Science and technology magazines published in Canada
Defunct magazines published in Canada
Magazines established in 1992
Magazines disestablished in 2003
Magazines published in Toronto
St. Joseph Media magazines
Magazines about the media